Harry Paterson is a Scottish rugby union player for Edinburgh in the Pro14. Paterson's primary position is wing or fullback.

Rugby Union career

Professional career
Paterson signed for Edinburgh academy in June 2020. He made his Pro14 debut in Round 4 of the Pro14 Rainbow Cup against .

Paterson made his international debut for Scotland 7s at the Singapore International 7s competition in April 2022, making 1 appearance. He made his second appearance at the Vancouver International 7s the following week.

External links
itsrugby Profile

References

Living people
Scottish rugby union players
Edinburgh Rugby players
Rugby union wings
Rugby union fullbacks
Year of birth missing (living people)